Gavialidium is a genus of insects found in India and Sri Lanka, belonging to the Tetrigidae family of Orthopterans in the tribe Scelimenini.

Species 
Gavialidium includes the species:Gavialidium carli Hebard, 1930Gavialidium crocodilum Saussure, 1862 - type species (as Scelymena crocodilus'' Saussure)

References 

Caelifera genera
Tetrigidae